The Northwestern Illinois Conference , known locally as the NWIC, was a high school conference in northwest and north central Illinois. The conference participated in athletics and activities in the Illinois High School Association. The conference included small public high schools, and one small private school, with enrollments between 75-400 students in Carroll, Jo Daviess, Stephenson and Winnebago counties.

History
Originally known as the Stephenson County Conference, the first year of competition was 1958 with four charter schools: Dakota, Durand, Lena-Winslow and Orangeville. In 1959 Freeport Aquin, Galena, Stockton and Warren joined from the disbanded US Grant Conference. Pearl City joined the conference in 1960 increasing the total number of teams to nine. The last year of competition under the Stephenson County name was 1962. 

Based on the fact that the conference contained schools from Jo Daviess, Stephenson and Winnebago Counties, in 1963 it became known as the Northwest Conference.  Additionally, in 1966, Lanark, from Carroll County, joined the conference, bringing the total number of schools to 10. In 1974 after Durand, Orangeville and Pearl City left for the Upstate Illini Conference, the remaining schools changed the name to the Northwestern Illinois Conference, also known as the NWIC.

Officially formed in 1974, the 7 members were Dakota, Freeport Aquin, Galena, Lanark, Lena-Winslow, Stockton and Warren. In 1977, Orangeville returned to the fold increasing the total teams to eight. As the 1986 school year began, Lanark High School consolidated with Shannon High School, becoming Eastland High School. After 30 years of membership, in 1988 Warren dropped out of the conference. However, East Dubuque quickly replaced them in 1989, keeping the total number of teams an even eight.  Unfortunately, in 1995 they decided to leave the conference.  This left the conference in a situation they had not had not been in since 1976, an odd number of teams for which to schedule.  The final season for the NWIC occurred in 1995.  Beginning in 1996, this conference merged with the Upstate Illini.

Member schools

Sources:IHSA Conferences, and IHSA Member Schools Directory

Membership timeline

Competitive Success
The Northwestern Illinois Conference won 5 team state championships in IHSA sponsored athletics and activities. The conference also produced 15 individual championships, including track & field, and wrestling.

State Champions

Team

Individual

References

External links
 Aquin Catholic High School
 Dakota High School
 Durand High School
 East Dubuque High School
 Eastland High School
 Galena High School
 Lena-Winslow High School
 Orangeville High School
 Pearl City High School
 Stockton High School
 Warren High School

High school sports in Illinois
Illinois high school sports conferences